Holland High School is a public high school located in Holland, Texas, United States and classified as a 2A school by the UIL. It is part of the Holland Independent School District located in the southeastern part of Bell County. In 2015, the school was rated "Met Standard" by the Texas Education Agency.

Academics
Team Debate Champions (Boys) - 
1926(All)

Athletics
The Holland Hornets compete in the following sports - 

Baseball
Basketball
Cross Country
Football
Golf
Powerlifting
Softball
Track and Field
Volleyball

References

External links
 Holland ISD

High schools in Bell County, Texas
Public high schools in Texas